Dergano is a district of Milan, Italy. It is an area located within Zone 9 of the city.

See also
Dergano (Milan Metro)

Districts of Milan
Former municipalities of Lombardy